This is a list of Norwegian football transfers in the winter transfer window 2014–15 by club. Only clubs of the 2015 Tippeligaen and 2015 Norwegian First Division is included.

2015 Tippeligaen

Bodø/Glimt

In:

Out:

Haugesund

In:

Out:

Lillestrøm

In:

Out:

Mjøndalen

In:

Out:

Molde

In:

Out:

Odd

In:

Out:

Rosenborg

In:

Out:

Sandefjord

In:

Out:

Sarpsborg 08

In:

Out:

Stabæk

In:

Out:

Start

In:

Out:

Strømsgodset

In:

Out:

Tromsø

In:

Out:

Viking

In:

 

Out:

Vålerenga

In:

Out:

Aalesund

In:

Out:

1. Divisjon

Brann

In:

Out:

Bryne

In:

Out:

Bærum

In:

Out:

Follo

In:

Out:

Fredrikstad

In:

Out:

Hødd

In:

Out:

Hønefoss

In:

Out:

Jerv

In:

Out:

Kristiansund

In:

Out:

Levanger

In:

Out:

Nest-Sotra

In:

Out:

Ranheim

In:

Out:

Sandnes Ulf

In:

Out:

Sogndal

In:

Out:

Strømmen

In:

Out:

Åsane

In:

Out:

References

Norway
Transfers
Transfers
2014–15